Palace Theatre, or Palace Theater, is the name of many theatres in different countries, including:

Australia
Palace Theatre, Melbourne, Victoria
Palace Theatre, Sydney, New South Wales

Canada
Palace Theatre, housed in the Robillard Block, Montreal, Canada
Palace Theatre in Calgary, Alberta, opened in 1921.

United Kingdom
 Palace Theatre, Kilmarnock, Scotland
 Palace Theatre, London, England
 Palace Theatre, Manchester, England
 Palace Theatre, Mansfield, England
 Palace Theatre, Newark, England
 Palace Theatre, Paignton, Devon, England
 Palace Theatre, Plymouth, Devon, England
 Palace Theatre, Redditch, England
 Watford Palace Theatre, England
 Palace Theatre, Westcliff-on-Sea, England
 Palace Theatre, Swansea, Wales

United States
(by state then city)
 Avalon Hollywood, formerly The Palace, Hollywood, California
 Palace Theater (Los Angeles), California
 Palace Theater (Bridgeport, Connecticut), 1922
 Palace Theater, part of the Stamford Center for the Arts, Stamford, Connecticut
 Palace Theater (Waterbury, Connecticut), listed on the National Register of Historic Places (NRHP) in New Haven County, Connecticut
 Palace Theater (Hilo, Hawaii), listed on the NRHP on the island of Hawaii
 Cadillac Palace Theatre, Chicago, Illinois
 Palace Theater (Gary, Indiana)
 Palace Theater (South Bend, Indiana), listed on the NRHP in St. Joseph County, Indiana
 Palace Theater (Kinsley, Kansas), listed on the NRHP in Edwards County, Kansas
 The Louisville Palace, Louisville, Kentucky
 Palace Theatre (Jonesboro, Louisiana),  NRHP-listed in Jackson Parish
Frostburg Palace Theatre, Frostburg, Maryland
 Palace Theatre, Boston, Massachusetts
 Hanover Theatre for the Performing Arts, formerly Poli's Palace Theater, Worcester, Massachusetts, listed on the NRHP in Worcester County, Massachusetts
 Palace Theater (Luverne, Minnesota), listed on the NRHP in Rock County, Minnesota
 Palace Theatre (St. Paul), Minnesota
 Palace Theatre (Manchester, New Hampshire)
 State Palace Theatre (New Orleans)
 Palace Theatre (Netcong, New Jersey), listed on the NRHP in Morris County, New Jersey
 Palace Theatre (Albany, New York), listed on the NRHP in Albany County, New York
 Palace Theatre (New York City), Broadway and W. 47th St.
 Palace Theatre (Syracuse, New York)
 Palace Theatre (Canton, Ohio)
 Palace Theatre (Cincinnati, Ohio), listed on the NRHP in Hamilton County, Ohio
 Palace Theatre (Cleveland, Ohio)
 Palace Theatre (Columbus, Ohio)
 Palace Theatre (Lorain, Ohio), listed on the NRHP in Lorain County, Ohio
 Palace Theatre (Marion, Ohio)
 Palace Theatre (Silverton, Oregon)
 Palace Theatre, Greensburg Downtown Historic District (Greensburg, Pennsylvania)
 Providence Performing Arts Center, formerly Palace Concert Theater, Providence, Rhode Island
 Palace Theatre, Broadway at the Beach, Myrtle Beach, South Carolina
 Palace Theater (Crossville, Tennessee), NRHP-listed in Cumberland County
 Palace Theatre (Gallatin, Tennessee), Gallatin, Tennessee
 Palace Theatre (El Paso, Texas), NRHP-listed in El Paso County
Palace Theatre (Georgetown, Texas)
 Palace Theatre (Cape Charles, Virginia)

See also
**

Lists of theatres